West Berlin was the name given to the western part of Berlin between 1949 and 1990. It may also refer to:

West Berlin, New Jersey, an unincorporated area in New Jersey (United States)
West Berlin, Nova Scotia, a community in Nova Scotia (Canada)

See also
 East Berlin (disambiguation)
 Berlin (disambiguation)
 Berliner (disambiguation)
 New Berlin (disambiguation)
 Berlin Township (disambiguation)